Pobuna mašina (trans. Machine Rebellion) is the fifth studio album by the Serbian alternative rock band Supernaut released independently by the band in 2010. The album is the band's final collaboration with the deceased produces Goran Živković "Žika", and is musically the third part of the album trilogy which started with Raj na nebu, pakao na Zemlji in 2000.

Track listing

Personnel 
 Srđan Marković "Đile" (vocals, guitar, sequenced by [drums])
 Saša Radić (bass guitar)

References 
 Album review at Popboks

Supernaut (Serbian band) albums
2010 albums
Serbian-language albums